Persier was the name of two ships operated by Lloyd Royal Belge.

, bought in 1917, sunk by gunfire from  later that year.

Ship names